The Bluevale and Whitevale Towers were twin tower block flats situated in the Camlachie district within the East End of Glasgow, Scotland. Officially named 109 Bluevale Street and 51 Whitevale Street, and often nicknamed the Gallowgate Twins or the Camlachie Twin Towers, the two towers were for a time the tallest buildings in Scotland.

After originally being condemned in 2011, in early 2016 the demolition of both towers was completed.

History

Faced with crippling housing shortages in the immediate post-war period, the city undertook the building of multi-storey housing in tower blocks in the 1960s and early 1970s on a grand scale, which led to Glasgow becoming the first truly high-rise city in Britain. However, many of these "schemes", as they are known, were poorly planned, or badly designed and cheaply constructed, which led to many of the blocks becoming insanitary magnets for crime and deprivation.

It would not be until 1988 that high rises were built in the city once again, with the construction of the 17-storey Forum Hotel next to the SECC. The 20-storey Hilton Hotel in Anderston followed in 1992. From the early 1990s, Glasgow City Council and its successor, the Glasgow Housing Association, have run a programme of demolishing the worst of the residential tower blocks, including Basil Spence's Gorbals blocks in 1993.

The buildings were unique in their construction – featuring hydraulic jacks in their foundations to combat sway due to their height.

At one time the tallest buildings in Scotland, with only 29 occupiable floors (the 30th floor was a mechanical floor for building services and a drying area) the towers were not the buildings with the highest occupied floor level in the city (or Scotland); that distinction belonged to the contemporary Red Road estate on the north side of the city. They were briefly Scotland's second tallest freestanding structure following the demolition of Inverkip Power Station on the Firth of Clyde in 2013.

Demolition

In November 2011, it was announced by Glasgow Housing Association of the intention to demolish the development, citing  the unpopularity of the estate among residents and high maintenance and running costs.

Demolition of the towers was originally scheduled to take place prior to the 2014 Commonwealth Games, but the complexity of the task pushed the date back to early 2015. Owing to the buildings' design, and their close proximity to the busy North Clyde Line railway which runs immediately next to the site, a conventional "blowdown" with explosives was deemed impractical. The buildings instead would be literally disassembled floor by floor using the "top down" method. The deconstruction process began on in January 2015, starting with the Bluevale tower. The neighbouring Whitevale tower was deconstructed in a similar fashion in 2016.

See also
 Glasgow tower blocks
List of tallest buildings and structures in Glasgow
List of tallest voluntarily demolished buildings

References

External links

'Lights Out', study of Gallowgate at Disappearing Glasgow

Former skyscrapers
Skyscrapers in Glasgow
Residential skyscrapers in Scotland
Demolished buildings and structures in Scotland
Residential buildings completed in 1968
Buildings and structures demolished in 2016
Parkhead
1968 establishments in Scotland
2016 disestablishments in Scotland
Twin towers